The hp 9g (F2222A) is a graphing calculator designed by Kinpo Electronics, Inc and produced by Hewlett-Packard. It has basic graphing, scientific and programming features designed for use by students.

Despite resembling a typical scientific calculator in appearance, such as those by competitors Casio and Sharp, the 9g departs from HP calculator tradition because it does not have an RPN mode. It is also particular unusual for its display, which includes a compact dot-matrix grid for displaying graphs, a dot-matrix character line which displays expressions being input (acting as a continuation of the dot-matrix grid), and a seven-segment line to display answers to expressions.

The HP-9g is similar to Citizen SRP-325G, also designed by Kinpo Electronics, Inc.

See also
Comparison of HP graphing calculators
List of HP calculators

References

External links
 HP-9g on MyCalcDB (database about 1970s and 1980s pocket calculators)
 Self-test function for hp 9g - also known as: Kinpo SG1, Citizen SRP325G

Graphing calculators
9g
Sunplus